The Argument Interchange Format (AIF) is an international effort to develop a representational mechanism for exchanging argument resources between research groups, tools, and domains using a semantically rich language. AIF traces its history back to a 2005 colloquium in Budapest. The result of the work in Budapest was first published as a draft description in 2006. Building on this foundation, further work then used the AIF to build foundations for the Argument Web.

AIF-RDF is the extended ontology represented in the Resource Description Framework Schema (RDFS) semantic language.

The Argument Interchange Format introduces a small set of ontological concepts that aim to capture a common understanding of argument -- one that works in multiple domains (both domains of argumentation and also domains of academic research), so that data can be shared and re-used across different projects in different areas. These ontological concepts are:
 Information (I-nodes)
 Applications of Rules of Inference (RA-nodes)
 Applications of Rules of Conflict (CA-nodes)
 Applications of Rules of Preference (PA-nodes)
extended by:
 Schematic Forms (F-nodes) that are instantiated by RA, CA and PA nodes

The AIF has reifications in a variety of development environments and implementation languages including
 MySQL database schema
 RDF
 Prolog
 JSON
as well as translations to visual languages such as DOT and SVG.

AIF data can be accessed online at AIFdb.

See also
Argument map

References

External links 
 http://www.argumentinterchange.org/
 http://www.aifdb.org

Argument technology